Gautam Kalita (Assamese: গৌতম কলিতা) is an Indian bodybuilder from Panigaon in Nagaon, Assam. He won the Mr World  title in the Bantam class during ESPN-Musclemania World, a bodybuilding championship held at Wilshire Grand Hotel in Los Angeles on 16–17 November 2007. He was born to Late Golok Kalita and Sabitry Kalita in Nagaon.

Gautam Kalita took to bodybuilding at the age of 20 with no formal training. He runs a gym named Nagaon Health Club at his home town.

Achievements
In Bantam class, his achievements include:
Mr. Nagaon  (1989–90)
Mr Assam (1994–98), five times
Mr North East (2001-2002-2003), three times
Mr India (2004-2005-2007)
Mr World (2007)

See also
Mahadev Deka
 See Photo

References

Bodybuilders from Assam
Indian bodybuilders
Living people
People from Nagaon district
Year of birth missing (living people)